Karoline Gräfin Hunyady (born 26 December 1836 in Vienna, Austrian Empire – died 28 February 1907 Vienna, Austria-Hungary) belonged to the Hungarian high nobility and was the lady-in-waiting to Empress Elisabeth of Austria-Hungary.

Biography 
She was a favorite and confidant of the empress. She was the empress' first Hungarian lady-in-waiting and gave her an enthusiasm for Hungary.

References 

   

1836 births
1907 deaths
Austrian ladies-in-waiting
Karoline